The Luck of the Navy is a British comedy thriller play by Mrs Clifford Mills in which a Royal Navy sailor is nearly framed by an enemy agent for the theft of secret documents. It was first performed in 1918 and continued to be performed post-war in London and by touring companies. Between 1919 and 1930 it was performed over 900 times in 148 theatres. It was also performed internationally: in Adelaide in 1920, Sydney in 1928 and Wellington in 1920.

It was revived at the Playhouse Theatre in London on 24 December 1934 and ran for 22 performances.

Film adaptations
In 1927, it was made into a silent film, The Luck of the Navy, directed by Fred Paul.

In 1937, it was adapted into a sound film, Luck of the Navy, directed by Norman Lee and starring Geoffrey Toone and Judy Kelly.

References

Bibliography
 Nicoll, Allardyce. English Drama, 1900-1930: The Beginnings of the Modern Period. Cambridge University Press, 1973.

External links 
 The Luck of the Navy on Great War Theatre

1919 plays
British plays adapted into films
Comedy thriller plays